The Champaign Aviation Museum is an aviation museum in Urbana, Ohio. It is situated on the north end of Grimes Field municipal airport, roughly a mile from central Urbana. The museum is known primarily for its ongoing restoration of a B-17 Flying Fortress to flying condition. It is also a component of the National Aviation Heritage Area, a federally designated heritage area primarily centered around sites pertaining to the Wright brothers.

History
The museum began with the purchase of the wreckage of a JB-17G/model 299Z, a B-17 engine testbed variant with a fifth engine mounted on the nose, and several other parts sourced from various B-17s. The parts and pieces arrived at Grimes Field in November 2005. Restoration work started on the aircraft by volunteers at the south end of the airport soon after. The museum was established as a 501(c)(3) non-profit organization in 2008, the same year a North American B-25 Mitchell was purchased. The next year the museum purchased a C-47 and a former waterbomber A-26. Work continued on the B-17 at the south end until 2010 when a purpose built hangar was completed and the B-17 project as well as the newly acquired aircraft were moved into it. In August 2011, the museum recovered the remains, primarily the empennage, of a B-17G wreckage from Talkeetna, Alaska for use in the restoration. In November 2018, a Grumman C-1 Trader in flying condition was donated to the museum.

Aircraft
The museum's collection consists of primarily vintage military aircraft, but also includes several civilian aircraft.

Exhibits 
In 2010 the museum began displaying an exhibit in their main hangar on Women Airforce Service Pilots (WASPs) and how they helped with the war effort.

In 2019 a 1941 Crosley convertible was donated to the museum and is on display in the museum's lobby.

The museum received a grant from the Ohio History Connection to complete a display about WASPs in 2022.

See also
List of aerospace museums
National Museum of the United States Air Force
Armstrong Air and Space Museum

References

Aerospace museums in Ohio
Museums in Champaign County, Ohio
Urbana, Ohio